SV Toufic El Rahman was a Syrian sailing ship that was sunk by the ,  east of Cape Greco, Crete in the Mediterranean Sea, while en route to Haifa.

Sinking 
SV Toufic El Rahman was en route to Haifa. All of the crew survived.

References

Maritime incidents in July 1942
Sailing ships
Ships sunk by German submarines in World War II
Ships sunk with no fatalities
World War II shipwrecks in the Mediterranean Sea